Gornaya Polyana is a rural locality (a settlement) in Pokrovskoye Rural Settlement, Leninsky District, Volgograd Oblast, Russia. The population was 80 as of 2010. There are 4 streets.

Geography 
The village is located on Caspian Depression, 71 km from Volgograd, 29 km from Leninsk, 8.3 km from Pokrovka.

References 

Rural localities in Leninsky District, Volgograd Oblast